Silver Wings may refer to:

 Silver Wings (film), a 1922 American silent film
 Silver Wings (parachute team), the United States Army Maneuver Center of Excellence Command Exhibition Parachute Team at Fort Benning, Georgia
 Silver Wings (service organization), an organization dedicated to developing civilians’ leadership skills and community service
 A 1969 hit country song from Merle Haggard's A Portrait of Merle Haggard album

See also 
 Srebrna krila (English: Silver Wings), a 1980s/90s Croatian pop band
 Silverwing (disambiguation)